This page is a complete chronological listing of AFL Women's premiers. The AFL Women's (AFLW) is the elite national competition in women's Australian rules football.

Each year, the premiership is awarded to the club that wins the AFL Women's Grand Final. The grand final was hosted by the minor premier in the first two seasons when no finals series existed, and was hosted by the preliminary final winner with the most premiership points (percentage would have come into consideration if points were the same) in 2019 when a conference system was in place. Since 2021, the grand final has been hosted by the higher-ranked preliminary final winner. In 2020, no premiership was awarded after the season was curtailed and eventually cancelled due to the COVID-19 pandemic.

List of premiers
The following is a list of premiers and the grand final results.

Premiership statistics

Premierships by team

Premiership frequency
The 2020 season is not included in the latter three columns, as the season was not fully contested and no premiership was awarded.

See also

 AFL Women's Grand Final
 List of VFL Women's premiers
 List of VFL/AFL premiers

References

Sources
 Official AFL Women's website

Premiers
Premiers